Kalyan Mukherjee was the deputy mayor of Kolkata Municipal Corporation (KMC) in the city of Kolkata, West Bengal, India. He was elected as a councillor from a ward in the North Kolkata. He is a member of the Revolutionary Socialist Party which is a part of the Left Front. As Deputy Mayor, Kalyan Mukherjee maintains the portfolio of  Water Supply in Ships, Agency & Stores, Mayor In Council.

Notes

Living people
Revolutionary Socialist Party (India) politicians
Politicians from Kolkata
Year of birth missing (living people)